The Alexander Brest Museum and Gallery is located in the Phillips Fine Arts Building on the campus of Jacksonville University. It was named for its primary benefactor. The museum features collections of carved ivory, Pre-Columbian artifacts, Steuben glass, Chinese porcelain, Cloisonné, Tiffany glass, and Boehm porcelain  as well as rotating exhibitions.

References

External links
Alexander Brest Museum and Gallery - official site at Jacksonville University
History of the Museum
Information about the Alexander Brest Museum and Gallery

Museums in Jacksonville, Florida
University museums in Florida
Art museums and galleries in Florida
Pre-Columbian art museums in the United States
Jacksonville University
Arlington, Jacksonville